Dmitry Vitalyevich Kuchugura (born 21 October 2004) is a Russian football player who plays for FC Krasnodar-2.

Club career
Kuchugura made his debut in the Russian Premier League for FC Krasnodar on 7 March 2022 in a game against FC Ural Yekaterinburg.

Career statistics

References

External links
 
 

2004 births
Living people
Russian footballers
Russia youth international footballers
Association football midfielders
FC Krasnodar players
FC Krasnodar-2 players
Russian Premier League players
Russian First League players